Anjana Om Kashyap is an Indian news anchor working with Hindi news channel Aaj Tak as a Senior Executive Editor. Kashyap started her journalistic career by joining the public broadcaster Doordarshan before moving to Zee News. She then went to News 24 before settling into Aaj Tak.

Early life and education 
Kashyap was born in a middle class  family to Omprakash Tiwari in Ranchi who originally came from Arrah, Bihar. Her father was a doctor on short-service-commission with the Indian Army, and served during the Bangladesh War of Liberation.

She had her initial schooling at Loreto Convent, a local Catholic school and then from Delhi Public School, Ranchi. She went on to pursue an honours in Botany from the University of Delhi. Kashyap went on to appear for the All India Pre Medical Test but failed to pass. She was a prolific debater and exhibited strong leadership qualities since childhood, having become the head-girl in both the schools and the president of her college hostel.

After a few years, she enrolled at the Delhi School of Social Work, for her post-graduation. Kashyap mentions that the curricula and field visits inculcated a spirit of public activism in her.

Career 
Kashyap's first job was as a counselor at the Daewoo Motors;, however she resigned soon after an year. She then joined an NGO in the roles of a legal counselor.

News Anchoring 
In the early 2000s, Kashyap opted for a diploma in journalism, from Jamia Millia Islamia. Upon graduation, she joined Doordarshan, where she was assigned to the news-desk of Aankhon Dekhi, an investigative show but was also allotted infrequent reporting duties.

Within a year, she moved to Zee News. Whilst she wanted to be an anchor all throughout; the channel found her lacking in speaking finesse and employed her in producing roles. In her later years at Zee, she successfully passed the auditions and were occasionally used as an anchor for special features.

In 2007, she joined News 24, where she was, for the first time, assigned a mainstream role at anchoring in the form of moderating an evening debate show. She left the venture in early 2012 and moved to Star News; however, it was shut down months later. Kashyap thus became one of the several journalists, to follow her immediate ex-boss at News24 – Supriya Prasad from News 24 to Aaj Tak, around late 2012.

Views 
Kashyap has been noted to be a strong voice against reservations in India for socially oppressed classes and likewise affirmative actions; in a media-panel discussion, she had once described the system to be infested by 'termites', which brought neither social mobility nor economic affluence for the target-populace. She mentions her Brahminical upbringing and the social tensions prevalent in the aftermath of enacting Mandal Commission recommendations, as contributing factors.

Reception

The Caravan 
A long-form piece over The Caravan (by Nikita Saxena), has been highly critical of Kashyap's journalism, noting the aggressive propagation of Hindutva centered ideologies and biased reporting in favour of the Bharatiya Janata Party, across a variety of situations. Scroll.in has noted her to be an establishment friendly news anchor.

Kashyap was one of the few reporters, who were allowed an interview by Narendra Modi, in the run-up to the 2019 National Elections. Saxena notes that Kashyap refused to pose any challenging question to him.

Kashyap's reporting of the 2019 Supreme Court proceedings on Ayodhya title dispute toed a pro-Hindutva line with numerous debates and special shows, that spanned a vast avenue from seeking the reasons behind a routine deferment of the case (around 18 October) to inquiring about why the Muslims were unable to compromise with a mere 5 acre land, and the timeline of Ram Mandir construction, all along with provocative headlines and audience-polls; it ended with welcoming the final verdict in favour of the Hindus, as a sacred occasion.

Riding a bulldozer while demolition 
During a demolition drive by the BJP government in the Jahangirpuri area despite Supreme Court orders to stop the demolitions, Anjana climbed on a bulldozer herself.

Miscellaneous 
While reporting about the 2019 Bihar encephalitis outbreak, Kashyap entered the neonatal ICU at Sri Krishna Medical College and Hospital and started haranguing the on-duty pediatrician. She was widely criticised for her inappropriate behaviour.  The Indian Medical Association subsequently filed a complaint against her, for endangering the lives of children, in an attempt to gain publicity.

Personal life 
Kashyap is married to Mangesh Kashyap, an officer of the 1995 Delhi, Andaman and Nicobar Islands Police Service cadre. Anjana met Mangesh during her days at Delhi University. Mangesh was the erstwhile Addl. Deputy Commissioner of the Delhi Police and since 2016, has been the Chief Vigilance Officer of South Delhi Municipal Corporation. They have a son and a daughter.

References

External links 
 
 

Living people
India Today people
Indian women television journalists
Indian television news anchors
Indian political journalists
Indian television talk show hosts
Jamia Millia Islamia alumni
Year of birth missing (living people)